The Carol Eckman Award is an award given annually since 1986 to the women's college basketball coach that "best demonstrates the character of the late Carol Eckman, the mother of the collegiate women's basketball national championship". Given by the Women's Basketball Coaches Association (WBCA), the award is named for former women's head coach Carol Eckman, best known for establishing in 1969 the first National Invitational Women's Intercollegiate Basketball Tournament.

Eckman, who served as head coach at West Chester State College, Indiana University of Pennsylvania, and Lock Haven State College, started the national tournament while at West Chester State College. She started the sixteen team tournament in 1969. Eckman invited 15 teams to the West Chester campus, charging each $25 to cover officials and awards. This tournament served as a springboard for the formation of the AIAW two years later, which administered national championships for many sports, including basketball, from 1971 until 1982, when the NCAA became involved in women's sports.

The criteria for the award include:
 Sportsmanship
 Commitment to the student-athlete
 Honesty
 Ethical behavior
 Courage

Winners

References

Sources

External links
Carol Eckman Award webpage. Women's Basketball Coaches Association (WBCA) official website

Awards established in 1986
College basketball coaching awards in the United States
Sportsmanship trophies and awards
1986 establishments in the United States